Kasba Peth Assembly constituency is one of the constituencies of Maharashtra Legislative Assembly, in India. This constituency is located in the Pune district and is a segment of Pune (Lok Sabha constituency).

Members of Legislative Assembly

Bypoll Election denoted by ^

Election results

2023 by-election

2019 results

2014 results

2009 results

2004 result

See also
 List of constituencies of Maharashtra Vidhan Sabha

References

Assembly constituencies of Pune district
Assembly constituencies of Maharashtra